Santa Teresa station is a light rail station operated by Santa Clara Valley Transportation Authority (VTA).  This station is the southern terminus of the Blue Line of the VTA Light Rail system. It was built in the late 1980s as part of the original Guadalupe Line, the first segment of light rail that stretched to Tasman in northern San Jose.

Santa Teresa station is located just south of State Route 85, near Santa Teresa Boulevard in the Santa Teresa neighborhood in southern San Jose, California. It is a major local transit center, and as such is the terminus of several bus routes. It is served by a shuttle to IBM's campus in South San Jose.

Service

Station layout

Connecting transit 

The station is also served by a shuttle to the IBM campus.

References

External links 

Santa Teresa park & ride lot info at VTA

Santa Clara Valley Transportation Authority light rail stations
Santa Clara Valley Transportation Authority bus stations
Railway stations in San Jose, California
Railway stations in the United States opened in 1987
1987 establishments in California